Reginald John Law (18 July 1924 – 26 January 2018) was an Australian rules footballer who played for the Footscray Football Club in the Victorian Football League (VFL).

Notes

External links 		

1924 births
2018 deaths
Australian rules footballers from Victoria (Australia)		
Western Bulldogs players
Yarraville Football Club players